Valentin Teodorica (born 26 January 1981) is a Romanian-Israeli professional association football player who played in the Israeli Premier League for Hapoel Kfar Saba and also played for Hapoel Mevaseret Zion, Hapoel Jerusalem, Hakoah Ramat Gan and Beitar Jerusalem.

References

1981 births
Living people
Romanian footballers
Israeli footballers
Beitar Jerusalem F.C. players
Hakoah Maccabi Ramat Gan F.C. players
Hapoel Jerusalem F.C. players
Hapoel Kfar Saba F.C. players
Hapoel Mevaseret Zion F.C. players
Israeli Premier League players
Liga Leumit players
Romanian expatriate footballers
Romanian people of Israeli descent
Romanian emigrants to Israel
Association football midfielders